One Ten may refer to:

110 (number)
110 BC
AD 110
Packard One-Ten, also known as One Ten, a model of automobile

See also
110 (disambiguation)